5th Ward may refer to:

Fifth Ward, Houston
5th Ward of New Orleans
5th Ward The Series, an American television series